Denis Aleksandrovich Bolshakov (born 7 June 1987) is a Russian former professional footballer.

Club career
He made his debut in the Russian Premier League in 2007 for FC Luch-Energiya Vladivostok.

In 2018, he signed for Saif Sporting Club in Bangladesh.

References

1987 births
People from Kasimov
Living people
Russian footballers
Russia youth international footballers
Association football midfielders
Russian expatriate footballers
Expatriate footballers in France
FC Dynamo Moscow reserves players
FC Luch Vladivostok players
Russian Premier League players
FC Torpedo Moscow players
FC SKA-Khabarovsk players
FC Oryol players
FC Lokomotiv Moscow players
Saif SC players
Bangladesh Football Premier League players
Expatriate footballers in Bangladesh
Sportspeople from Ryazan Oblast
FC Tom Tomsk players
FC Olimp-Dolgoprudny players